"It Kills Me" is a R&B single by Melanie Fiona as the second U.S. single (third in Canada after "Give It to Me Right") from The Bridge. The track spent nine weeks as number-one on the US Billboard R&B singles chart. The track also peaked just outside the Top 40 on the Billboard Hot 100, peaking at 43. Fiona received a Grammy nomination in the category of Best Female R&B Vocal Performance for the track, however, the Grammy was awarded to Beyoncé for "Single Ladies (Put a Ring on It)". The song samples "(Hey There) Lonely Girl" by The Softones.

The official remix features rapper Ghostface Killah.

Charts

Weekly charts

Year-end charts

Certifications

See also
List of R&B number-one singles of 2010 (U.S.)

References

2009 singles
Melanie Fiona songs
Songs written by Andrea Martin (musician)
Songs with music by Leon Carr
2009 songs
Contemporary R&B ballads
Soul ballads
2000s ballads